A xunfu was an important imperial Chinese provincial office under both the Ming (14th–17th centuries) and Qing (17th–20th centuries) dynasties. However, the purview of the office under the two dynasties differed markedly. However, since the mid-17th century, xunfu became the title of a regular provincial governor overseeing civil administration in the Qing dynasty.

Under both dynasties, the xunfu was subordinate in military affairs to the multi-provincial zongdu (總督), usually translated as "supreme commander" under the Ming and "governor-general" or "viceroy" under the Qing.

Ming grand coordinator
The "grand coordinator" of the Ming dynasty (1368–1644) was one of several institutional innovations promoted by the Xuande Emperor (r. 1425–1435). Following precedents set by the  Hongwu and Yongle emperors, who had sent officials on temporary civilian and military missions in the provinces, in September 1425 Xuande appointed officials to "tour and pacify" (xunfu) two southern provinces. Five years later, three more officials from the central government were sent to Henan, Shaanxi, and Sichuan on similar assignments. There is also evidence that more "touring pacifiers" were sent to the field between 1425 and 1430, when the position did not yet formally exist. In 1435, grand coordinators were also dispatched to provinces on the northern borders of the Ming empire, from Gansu in the west to Liaodong in the east. Eventually there were grand coordinators in every province.

Grand coordinators could also take charge of strategically important regions that were not provinces. In 1547, one was sent to curb smuggling and piracy on the coasts of Fujian and Zhejiang. Another one was appointed to Tianjin to protect access to Beijing in 1597 during a large-scale Japanese attack on Korea.

Grand coordinators were members of no specific agency and only received ad hoc commissions with no definite tenure. They managed and oversaw provincial government by coordinating the work of the three highest provincial agencies: the Provincial administration commission (buzheng si 布政司), the Provincial surveillance commission (ancha si 按察司), and the Regional military commissioner (du si 都司). Because grand coordinators were also high-ranking members of the Censorate, they had impeachment powers and direct access to the throne, which considered them to be "provincial-level surrogate[s] of the emperor". Although they were civil officials, they also received military titles when they had to supervise important military matters.

Qing governor
The Qing dynasty (1636–1912) kept the position of xunfu, but gave it a meaning different enough that scholars have translated the Qing xunfu as "governor" instead of "grand coordinator".

Nguyễn dynasty 

In Vietnam under the Nguyễn dynasty the title of Tuần phủ (巡撫), or tuần vũ, existed as a similar office based on the contemporary Qing administrative position. A Tuần phủ typically governed a single province and was below the authority of a Tổng đốc.

References

Citations

Sources 

 

1430 establishments in Asia
15th-century establishments in China
Government of the Ming dynasty
Government of the Qing dynasty